The fourth vow is a religious solemn vow that is taken by members of various religious institutes of the Catholic Church, after the three traditional vows of poverty, chastity and obedience. It usually is an expression of the congregation's charism and particular insertion in the apostolic field of the Church.

In the Society  of Jesus 

After a period of service as a priest, members of the Society of Jesus—referred to as Jesuits—can be allowed to take a fourth vow of obedience to the pope with regard to the missions. 

The text of the vow is 
"(...) I further promise a special obedience to the sovereign pontiff in regard to the missions, according to the same Apostolic Letters and the Constitutions". The same text is being used today, just as it was in the days of Saint Ignatius of Loyola.

The vow is an expression of a strong attachment the Jesuits have for the Church, and their willingness to accept whatever service the Church asks (through the pope) if it is of a great apostolic need. In part VII of the Constitutions, discussing the 'distribution of the members in the Vineyard of the lord' the founding fathers explain the purpose of the fourth vow: "Those who first united to form the Society were from different provinces and realms and did not know into which regions they were to go, whether among the faithful or the unbelievers; and therefore to avoid erring in the path of the Lord, they made that promise or vow in order that His Holiness might distribute them for greater glory to God"

This vow is limited to the priests of the Society. Only those who have been accepted by the Society to take this vow may serve as major superiors in the Society of Jesus.

In other religious institutes 
Other religious institutes have adopted the practice of taking a fourth vow:

 The Religious Sisters of Mercy take a fourth vow of service to the poor, sick, and ignorant.
 The Franciscan Friars of the Immaculate take a fourth vow of devotion to Mary.
 The Legionaries of Christ take a vow never to seek positions of authority within the Legion.
 The Missionaries of Charity take the fourth vow to serve the poorest of the poor.
 The Order of the Blessed Virgin Mary of Mercy requires that its members take a fourth vow, a vow to die for another who is in danger of losing their faith.

A fourth vow of the Missionaries of Christ Jesus was suppressed in 1969. A fifth vow of the Legionaries was suppressed in 2009.

Citations

Bibliography 
The Constitutions of the Society of Jesus (ed. by George Ganss), Saint Louis (USA), 1970.
Johannes Günter Gerhartz: Insuper Promitto; Die feierlichen Sondergelübde Orde, Rome, 1966.
Albert Chapelle: Le quatrième vœu dans la Compagnie, Rome, 1978.
John W. O'Malley: The fourth vow in its Ignatian context: a historical study, in Studies in the Spir. of the Jesuits, vol.15, 1983.
 

Society of Jesus
Religious oaths